One Day, Isang Araw is a 1988 Filipino action comedy film directed by Pablo Santiago and starring Fernando Poe Jr. and child actress Matet de Leon. Produced by Regal Films, the film was released on August 18, 1988, and was a box-office success. It was also given a positive review by film critic Lav Diaz, who praised its honest depiction of street children in the Philippines.

Cast
Fernando Poe Jr. 
Matet de Leon as Precious/Purunggay
Dawn Zulueta 
Dencio Padilla 
Paquito Diaz as Baldo
Bayani Casimiro as Don Paquito, Purunggay's grandfather
Odette Khan as Sophia
Johnny Wilson as Brando
Balot as a jeepney driver
Malu de Guzman as Auntie
Flora Gasser as yaya of Purunggay
Larry Silva
Bamba as a yagit
Sunshine as a yagit
RR Herrera as a yagit
Atong as a yagit
Rudy Meyer as Capt. Rodriguez
Jose Romulo as Police
Rene Hawkins
Rachel Ann Wolfe as Cynthia
Lawrence Pineda as Cynthia's Boyfriend

Production
The film was made in part as one of the eight films presented for the 15th anniversary of Regal Films in 1988.

Casting
On March 6, 1988, Dawn Zulueta's first day as a co-host of GMA Supershow, she was informed to have been cast, in her first major film role, as the love interest of Fernando Poe Jr. in One Day, Isang Araw.

Reception

Critical response
Lav Diaz of the Manila Standard gave One Day, Isang Araw a positive review, pointing out that even though the film has many shortcomings in terms of believability and continuity, they are easily forgivable because of the film's depiction of the "enormous sickness" in Philippine society, that of orphaned street children who have been forgotten and neglected by others.

Accolades

References

External links

1988 films
1980s action comedy films
Filipino-language films
Films about orphans
Films directed by Pablo Santiago
Philippine action comedy films
Regal Entertainment films
1988 comedy films